Granard is a barony in County Longford, Republic of Ireland.

Etymology
Granard barony derives its name from the village of Granard (Irish Gránard, possibly meaning "sun height" or "corn height").

Location

Granard barony is located in northeastern County Longford and contains Lough Gowna and many other lakes.

List of settlements

Below is a list of settlements in Granard barony:
Abbeylara
Ballinalee
Granard

References

Baronies of County Longford